Honey Creek State Natural Area is a nature preserve of almost 2300 acres in western Comal County, Texas, United States. The Texas Parks and Wildlife Department acquired part of the natural area from the Nature Conservancy in 1985 and the rest from a private individual in 1988. Honey Creek opened in 1985 with access by guided tour only. Since Honey Creek is designated a "Natural Area" rather than a "State Park", the Texas Parks and Wildlife Department's first priority is the maintenance and preservation of the property's natural state.

Flora and fauna
The dry rocky uplands are dominated by Ashe juniper, live oak, agarita and Texas persimmon. Cedar elm, Spanish oak, pecan, walnut and Mexican buckeye are found nearer the creek bed. In the floodplain, the dominant trees are sycamore and bald cypress. Texas palmetto, columbine and maidenhair fern grow along the banks of the creek.

Many of the typical animals found in the Texas Hill Country reside in Honey Creek, including wild turkeys, Eastern fence lizards, armadillos and leopard frogs. Some of the more unusual species include Cagle's map turtle, Guadalupe bass (the Texas state fish), four-lined skink, green kingfisher and the Texas salamander. In addition, Honey Creek is one of the nesting sites of the endangered golden-cheeked warbler.

References

State parks of Texas
Protected areas of Comal County, Texas
1985 establishments in Texas